The 1978–79 BYU Cougars men's basketball team represented Brigham Young University in the 1978–79 college basketball season. This was head coach Frank Arnold's 4th season at BYU. The Cougars reached the NCAA tournament and finished the season with a record of 20–8, 10–2 in the Western Athletic Conference.

Roster

Schedule

|-
!colspan=9 style=| Regular Season

|-
!colspan=12 style=|NCAA Tournament

References 

BYU Cougars men's basketball seasons
Byu
Byu
1978 in sports in Utah
1979 in sports in Utah